A leadership election was held in 2019 for the Republicans. It was triggered by the resignation of Laurent Wauquiez and was won by Christian Jacob.

Candidates
 Julien Aubert, member of the National Assembly for Vaucluse's 5th constituency
 Christian Jacob, group president of The Republicans in the National Assembly and the member for Seine-et-Marne's 4th constituency
 Guillaume Larrivé, member of the National Assembly for Yonne's 1st constituency

Results

References 

2019 elections in France
October 2019 events in France
Political party leadership elections in France
The Republicans (France)
The Republicans (France) leadership election